Tadeusz Pieronek (pronounced ; 24 October 1934 in Radziechowy, Poland – 27 December 2018 in Kraków) was a Polish Roman Catholic auxiliary bishop-emeritus, Catholic academic and professor of theology and civil law. Pieronek was a leading member of the Stefan Batory Foundation (a George Soros Foundation branch in Poland).

Biography
Pieronek was born to Polish parents in the Żywiec Beskids village of Radziechowy near Żywiec in interbellum Poland. Ordained a priest in 1957 under the communist regime, from 1951 to 1954 he studied at the Theological Faculty of the Jagiellonian University in Cracow, then after its dissolution by the Communist government at the major seminary of the archdiocese of Cracow, from 1956 until 1960 at the Faculty of Canon Law at the Catholic University of Lublin. From 1961 until 1965 he studied in Rome at the Pontifical Lateran University, specializing in civil law as well as canon law. He received his doctorate in 1975, and was appointed theology professor in 1987.

He was auxiliary bishop of the Sosnowiec from 1992 to 1998. From 1993 until 1998 he was secretary-general of the Polish bishops' conference. In 1998 he resigned his post after Piotr Libera was elected bishop and Pieronek was appointed titular bishop of Cufrura. From 1998 to 2004 he was rector of the Pontifical Academy of Theology. In 2007 he celebrated his 50th priestly anniversary with Cardinal Stanislaw Dziwisz in his residence in Cracow. In 2008, Pieronek received the Jan Karski Eagle Award to honour Pieronek's combat for tolerance and his efforts to fight against the "extremism" and alleged "antisemitic tendencies" of Radio Maryja, led by Redemptorist Father Tadeusz Rydzyk C.Ss.R. In his later years, Pieronek supported the social project of the Children's Hospice "Father Józef Tischner” in the city of Cracow. Bishop Pieronek supported the work of the Open Society Institute of George Soros.

Holocaust interview

In an interview in 2010, Pieronek claimed that Jews and the state of Israel "exploit" the Holocaust, which he labelled as such a "Jewish invention", but a crime he did not statistically or historically deny. Furthermore, Pieronek stated that the suffering of people at the hands of Nazis and in concentration camps was "not exclusively Jewish", pointing to Polish prisoners and treatment of Catholic priests by Nazi authorities. In the interview he said that recent Israeli and Jewish claims that Poland is antisemitic and might consider reparation payments to Jewish Holocaust survivors, were calumnious, ridiculous and a falsification of the complex history of Polish society; simultaneously Pieronek stated, that western and U.S. media and politics are dominated by Jews. The Anti-Defamation League (ADL) criticized Pieronek's statement. On January 26, bishop Pieronek stated, that his statements had been taken out of context and totally misunderstood.

References

External links
Bp. Pieronek at catholic-hierarchy.org 
'Holocaust was a Jewish invention', says top Polish bishop. In: The News.pl, 25 January 2010
Pacifici racconta barzellette: la Polonia non é antisemita. Gli Israeliani non rispettano i diritti umani dei palestinesi. La shoa non é solo ebraica, ma riguarda cattolici e polacchi. Israele gode di buona stampa: il potere economico, pontifex.roma.it, 25 gennaio 2010

1934 births
2018 deaths
20th-century Roman Catholic bishops in Poland
Polish Roman Catholic theologians
People from Żywiec County